Mejlø is a small uninhabited Danish island located in the Kattegat. Mejlø covers an area of 0.4 km2, and the highest point on the island is  9 m.

References 

Danish islands in the Baltic
Islands of Denmark
Geography of Kerteminde Municipality